Charaxes setan, the black rajah, is a butterfly in the family Nymphalidae. It was described by H. Detani in 1983. It is endemic to Banggai in the Australasian realm.

References

External links
Charaxes Ochsenheimer, 1816 at Markku Savela's Lepidoptera and Some Other Life Forms

setan
Butterflies described in 1983